The Sabre Dinghy is a class single-handed sailboat that is 12'4" or 3.76 m long. The boat was designed in 1974 by Rex Fettell, who also designed the Minnow. As of 2017 over 2,000 sail numbers have been issued.

In the 2012 Australian National Titles, there were 130 boats on the start line, making it one of the largest national championships to be held that year of any class boat in Australia. The first national championships were held at Lake Cootharaba in Queensland in 1979.

The boat is built in either fibreglass or as a composite (timber deck and fibreglass hull) or plywood by the stitch and glue method and weighs in at minimum of 41 kg (90 lbs).

The rig is simple and easily handled but still provides exciting performance in a breeze.

Being easy to sail and suited to all sailors of varying abilities, it is popular both with learners and the less physically strong sailors who find more powerful boats like the Laser overpowering.

In Australia the Sabre is sailed in over 36 clubs in the state of Victoria, where it is one of the most active supporters of Victorian Yachting Council activities. The fleets in Victoria are at Albert Park Yacht Club, Albert Sailing Club, Altona Yacht Club, Apollo Bay Sailing Club, Ballarat Yacht Club, Beaumaris Yacht Club, Bendigo Yacht Club, Black Rock Yacht Club, Blairgowrie Yacht Squadron, Cairn Curran Sailing Club, Carrum Sailing Club, Chelsea Yacht Club, Colac Yacht Club, Corio Bay Sailing Club, Cowes Yacht Club, Davey's Bay Yacht Club, Elwood Sailing Club, Flinders Yacht Club, Frankston Yacht Club, Gippsland Lakes Yacht Club, Hampton Sailing Club, Indented Head Yacht Club, Lake Boga Yacht Club, Latrobe Valley Yacht Club, Lysterfield Sailing Club, McCrae Yacht Club, Mordialloc Sailing Club, Mt Martha Yacht Club, Parkdale Yacht Club, Portarlington Sailing Club, Rye Yacht Club, Safety Beach Sailing Club, Somers Yacht Club, Sugarloaf Sailing Club, Westernport Yacht Club and Williamstown Sailing Club.

Small fleets in South Australia are centred on the Brighton and Seacliff Yacht Club, Wallaroo Sailing Club and Port River Sailing Club.

Western Australia has strong fleets sailing out of Maylands Yacht Club, Perth Dinghy Sailing Club and Royal Perth Yacht Club.

Tasmania has fleets sailing out of Burnie Yacht Club, Deviot Sailing Club, Lindisfarne Sailing Club, Midway Point Yacht Club, Montrose Bay Yacht Club and Wynyard.

The boat is also well represented in New South Wales with Connells Point Sailing Club,Kogarah Bay Sailing Club Richmond River Sailing Club, Woollahra Sailing Club, St George Sailing Club, Twofold Bay YC and Wallagoot Lake Boat Club

Queensland has fleets at Maroochy Sailing Club and the Royal Queensland Yacht Squadron. Tweed Valley Sailing Club (NSW) has a growing fleet. Sabre's can be found at Cleveland Yacht Club, Tin Can Bay Yacht Club, Southport Yacht Club and Lake Cootharaba Sailing Club. In the past Cleveland Yacht Club has had many boats and even held the national championships in 2002, but interest in the boat has dropped off and now Maroochy Sailing Club and Royal Qld Yacht Squadron have the two largest fleets. 

Australian Capital Territory sail out of the YMCA Sailing Club Canberra.

External links
 Sabre Sailing Association of Australia

Dinghies